The 2006 FIBA Africa Basketball Club Championship (21st edition), was an international basketball tournament  held in Lagos, Nigeria, from November 18 to 26, 2006. The tournament, organized by FIBA Africa and hosted by Dodan Warriors, was contested by 12 clubs split into 2 groups of 6, the first four of which qualifying for the knock-out stage.
 
The tournament was won by Petro Atlético from Angola.

Qualification

Draw

Squads

Preliminary rounds
Times given below are in UTC+1.

Group A

Group B

Knockout stage

Quarter-finals

9th-12th place

5th-8th place

Semifinals

11th place

9th place

7th place

5th place

Bronze medal game

Gold medal game

Final standings

Petro Atlético rosterCarlos Morais, Domingos Bonifácio, Eduardo Mingas, Feliciano Camacho, Fernando Albano, Frederick Gentry, Jorge Tati, Leonel Paulo, Luís Costa, Mílton Barros, Shannon Crooks, Víctor de Carvalho, Coach: Alberto de Carvalho

Statistical Leaders

All Tournament Team

See also 
2007 FIBA Africa Championship

References

External links 
 2006 FIBA Africa Champions Cup Official Website
 

2006 FIBA Africa Basketball Club Championship
2006 FIBA Africa Basketball Club Championship
2006 FIBA Africa Basketball Club Championship
FIBA